Lymantria subrosea is a moth of the family Erebidae first described by Francis Walker in 1855. It is found from Sri Lanka to China and Sundaland, the Philippines, Sulawesi, Seram, the Lesser Sundas to Timor. The Sumatran population is categorized under the subspecies, Lymantria subrosea singapura.

The caterpillar is a pest of Terminalia cala and Shorea robusta.

References

External links
Synthetic Lymantriid Pheromones Attract Male Moths of Lymantria spp. (Lepidoptera: Lymantriidae) in Sumatra

Lymantria
Moths of Asia
Moths described in 1855